Carmel is a small village in  Flintshire, Wales, just outside Holywell. Carmel has a primary school, a village hall, a church and chapel. Carmel & District Cricket Club played their matches in the village until the 1990s when they moved to a new ground a short distance away. It is in Whitford Community. Carmel is west of Holway.

References

Villages in Flintshire